By the Fireplace is a 1917 Russian drama film directed by Pyotr Chardynin.

Plot 
The film is about a married couple. A woman loves to sing, and her husband loves to listen to her by the fireplace. One fine evening, the husband receives an order according to which
He must go on a business trip. All guests leave the house. All but the prince, in love with Lydia.

Cast 
 Vera Kholodnaya	
 Vladimir Maksimov as Peshcherskij
 Vitold Polonsky as Lanin

References

External links 
 

1917 films
1910s Russian-language films
Russian drama films